Bina is an unincorporated community in Ashe County, North Carolina, United States. It is located southeast of Lansing on North Carolina Highway 194, along with West Deep Ford Road and McNeil Road.

The Virginia–Carolina Railway was an interstate railroad in southwestern Virginia and northwestern North Carolina. It ran from Abingdon in Washington County, Virginia to Todd in Ashe County. The line charted a complicated course through the mountains through Bina, crossing the Blue Ridge near  Mount Rogers.

References

Unincorporated communities in Ashe County, North Carolina
Unincorporated communities in North Carolina